J. Ray Morrison (February 28, 1885 – November 19, 1982) was an American football and baseball player and a coach of football, basketball, and baseball.  He served as the head football coach at Southern Methodist University (1915–1916, 1922–1934), Vanderbilt University (1918, 1935–1939), Temple University (1940–1948), and Austin College (1949–1952), compiling a career college football record of 155–130–33.   He was inducted into the College Football Hall of Fame as a coach in 1954.

As a player, he was one of the greatest quarterbacks in the history of Vanderbilt Commodores football. Morrison was selected as the quarterback and kick returner for an Associated Press Southeast Area All-Time football team 1869–1919 era. He piloted the team to two Southern Intercollegiate Athletic Association (SIAA) titles in 1910 and 1911. The 1910 team fought defending national champion Yale to a scoreless tie. Yale coach Ted Coy called Morrison "the greatest player I have seen in years." In 1911, Coy selected Morrison All-American and the Atlanta Constitution voted Vanderbilt the best backfield in the South.

He took over as coach at his alma mater Vanderbilt after the retirement of legendary coach Dan McGugin. Morrison was the Southeastern Conference (SEC) Coach of the Year in 1937. He was also the first head coach in the history of SMU Mustangs football, and helped popularize the forward pass in the Southwest with his "Flying Circus" teams, most notably when led by Gerald Mann.

Early years
Ray Morrison was born on February 28, 1885, in Sugar Branch, Indiana. Soon after the family moved to McKenzie, Tennessee, where Morrison attended school. He also spent a year at McTyeire School for Boys.

Vanderbilt University
To achieve funds for college, Morrison worked on a dredge boat on the Mississippi River for a year. Morrison won Bachelor of Ugliness for the class of 1912. He played on the football and baseball teams with his brother Kent.

Football
He played football as a prominent quarterback and halfback for Dan McGugin's Vanderbilt football teams from 1908 to 1911. He is considered one of the best quarterbacks in Vanderbilt's long history. The team posted a 30–6–2 record during his four years. He was selected for an all-time Vanderbilt team in 1934. Morrison was selected as the quarterback and kick returner for an Associated Press Southeast Area All-Time football team 1869–1919 era. He weighed some 155 to 159 pounds.

1908
The 1908 squad was hampered by a wealth of sophomores, which McGugin with the help of halfback Morrison led to a 7–2–1 campaign, including a loss to rival Sewanee. In a 16–9 defeat of Tennessee, widely considered their greatest team at that point, Walker Leach got loose for a 60-yard run on a fake kick, tracked down by Morrison and stopped short of the goal.

1909
The 1909 team lost to SIAA champion Sewanee, its first loss to a Southern team in six years.

1910
The 1910 team won the SIAA title and fought defending national champion Yale to a scoreless tie on Yale Field. Yale coach Ted Coy called Morrison "the greatest player I have seen in years."  He was selected All-Southern by several writers.

Vanderbilt won a close game over Mississippi 9–2. Late in the first quarter, Morrison returned a punt 90 yards for Vanderbilt's touchdown. John Heisman was the game's field judge, and McGugin did not want to show too much, playing Heisman's Georgia Tech in two weeks. Morrison was the star of the Georgia Tech game, scoring two touchdowns.

1911

Edwin Pope's Football's Greatest Coaches on the 1911 team reads "A lightning-swift backfield of Lew Hardage, Wilson Collins, Ammie Sikes, and Ray Morrison pushed Vandy through 1911 with only a 9–8 loss to Michigan." The Atlanta Constitution voted it the best backfield in the South. Ted Coy selected Morrison All-American.  He was unanimously selected All-Southern.

Morrison, Hardage and Rabbi Robins had two touchdowns each in a 45–0 win over Central.  Morrison had two short touchdown runs in a 17–0 win over Georgia, and had a 22-yard run on a fake punt. In "easily the greatest southern game of the season", Vanderbilt claimed the SIAA title by beating Mississippi 21–0. Morrison had a 70-yard run, and on a fake punt out of his own end zone ran for 75 yards. Against Sewanee, Morrison threw a touchdown pass to Hardage, as well as had a short touchdown run.

Baseball
Morrison also played on the baseball team, moved to the outfield from catcher in his junior year, and back to catcher as a senior. The 1910 and 1912 teams won the SIAA. Morrison was captain of the 1912 team.

Coaching years
Morrison first taught and was athletics director at Branham & Hughes Military Academy in Spring Hill. Upon American entry into World War I, Morrison went to Fort Oglethorpe. In 1919, Morrison spent a year at Gulf Coast Military Academy as athletics director and teacher.

SMU
Ray Morrison was the first head coach in the history of SMU Mustangs football. He won just two games in two years from 1915 to 1916.

Return 
In 1920, Morrison returned to SMU. He notably brought the forward pass to the southwest during his time at SMU.  Morrison was one of the first to pass not just on first down, but on first and second down too. His teams earned the nickname the "Flying Circus".

They won the 1923, 1926, and 1931 Southwest Conference (SWC) titles. An 18-game unbeaten streak was ended in the 1925 Dixie Classic, with a touchdown off a tipped pass for West Virginia Wesleyan's Gale Bullman, and a 30-yard field goal missed in the final minute.  Morrison's best passer, Hall of Fame quarterback Gerald Mann, led the team to the 1926 title. The 1929 team was undefeated, but with four ties, including one with undefeated TCU to close the season.

Vanderbilt
He coached Vanderbilt in 1918 when McGugin left for the military, and led the Vanderbilt team to a 4–2 record. The team beat Tennessee 76–0, the largest margin of victory in the history of the rivalry. Former Nashville Banner sportswriter Fred Russell's book Fifty Years of Vanderbilt Football published in 1938, wrote:

"Salient after salient was wiped out by Gen. Morrison's forces and Tennessee's reinforcements could not check the tide. The retreat turned into a bloody, hopeless rout. Berryhill was cited for bravery for his wonderful outflanking the enemy, by which he took six positions (touchdowns) single-handedly. The result was 76−0."

Morrison was also the head basketball coach at Vanderbilt for one season in 1918–19, tallying a mark of 8–2, and the head baseball coach at the school in 1919, notching a record of 3–3.

Return
Upon the retirement of the legendary McGugin, Morrison was hand-picked as successor at his alma mater.  Morrison brought his own staff from SMU and neglected the retained Josh Cody's coaching abilities.

Fred Russell offered this description of Morrison upon his arrival as coach of Vanderbilt:

Morrison's first team in his second stint finished second place in the Southeastern Conference (SEC), led by captain and SEC player of the year Willie Geny. The 1936 team was captained by Dick Plasman, the last NFL player to play without a helmet. The 1937 team upset LSU on a hidden ball trick, the school's first-ever victory over a ranked opponent (the AP Poll began in 1936). The team's captain was SEC player of the year Carl Hinkle and also featured Baby Ray. Morrison was awarded SEC Coach of the Year in 1937.

Temple
After the 1939 season, Morrison resigned from his position at Vanderbilt to go to Temple, with Cody as his line coach. He resigned from Temple in 1949.

Austin College
He finished his career at Austin College. He quit to take over "development and public relations" at SMU, a post he held for eleven years.

Death
Morrison died at the home of his son in Miami Springs, Florida, at the age of 97.

Head coaching record

Football

See also
 List of college football head coaches with non-consecutive tenure

References

Bibliography

External links
 

1885 births
1982 deaths
American football quarterbacks
Baseball catchers
Baseball outfielders
Austin Kangaroos football coaches
SMU Mustangs football coaches
Temple Owls football coaches
Vanderbilt Commodores baseball coaches
Vanderbilt Commodores baseball players
Vanderbilt Commodores football coaches
Vanderbilt Commodores football players
Vanderbilt Commodores men's basketball coaches
All-Southern college football players
College Football Hall of Fame inductees
College men's basketball head coaches in the United States
People from McKenzie, Tennessee
People from Switzerland County, Indiana
Coaches of American football from Tennessee
Players of American football from Tennessee
Baseball coaches from Tennessee
Baseball players from Tennessee
Basketball coaches from Tennessee